Timothy III may refer to:

 Timothy Salophakiolos, patriarch of Alexandria in 460–475 and 477–481, considered Timothy III by the Greek Orthodox Church
 Timothy IV of Alexandria, patriarch of Alexandria in 517–535, considered Timothy III in the Coptic Church